The Corpo Ausiliario delle Squadre d'azione di Camicie Nere (Italian: Auxiliary Corps of the Black Shirts' Action Squads), most widely known as the Black Brigades, was one of the Fascist paramilitary groups, organized and run by the Republican Fascist Party (Partito Fascista Repubblicano, PFR) operating in the Italian Social Republic (in northern Italy), during the final years of World War II, and after the signing of the Italian Armistice in 1943. They were officially led by Alessandro Pavolini, former Minister of Culture of the fascist era during the last years of the Kingdom of Italy.

History

Background
On 26 July 1943 Italian dictator, Benito Mussolini, was arrested after the Italian Grand Council of Fascism (Gran Consiglio del Fascismo), with the support of King Vittorio Emanuele III, overthrew him and began negotiations with the Allies for Italy's withdrawal from the war. The Italian government was taken over by Marshal Pietro Badoglio, who outlawed the National Fascist Party (Partito Nazionale Fascista, PNF) and confiscated all of its assets.

On 12 September Mussolini was rescued in the Gran Sasso raid by German Luftwaffe Fallschirmjäger (paratroopers) led by General Kurt Student and the Waffen-SS Obersturmbannführer (Lieutenant Colonel), Otto Skorzeny. He was then installed by the Germans as the President of the Italian Social Republic (RSI). The RSI was to be an Italian regime which was to nominally administer the German-occupied northern Italy.

As the Milizia Volontaria per la Sicurezza Nazionale (MVSN, also known as "Blackshirts", Camicie Nere) had been disbanded in August by the terms of the armistice, the Guardia Nazionale Repubblicana was formed on 24 November 1943, and was to constitute the new fascist police force. The Guardia Nazionale Repubblicana was formed out of local police, ex-army, ex-Blackshirts and others still loyal to the fascist cause.

Anti-fascist political forces in Northern Italy, on their side, decided to oppose in arms against the RSI and the German occupants, and began to recruit armed clandestine formations for guerrilla and urban warfare, with support from the Allies. Soon, a bloody civil war started in northern Italy.

Constitution
However, as soon as the fascist party in the RSI was reopened and reorganized as Republican Fascist Party (Partito Fascista Repubblicano - PFR), its members began to organize "private" armed units, to protect themselves and party officials from attacks by Italian resistance fighters, who actually started very soon to target RSI authorities and supporters. RSI manpower proved to be insufficient, and Italian authorities decided to organize all fascist party volunteer units in a dedicated structure, and to raise new forces.
The Black Brigades were formed from members of the Republican Fascist Party. Formation of the Black Brigades was sanctioned by a Fascist Republican Party decree issued personally by Benito Mussolini, head of PFR and of the RSI government, dated 30 June 1944, stating that all existing fascist armed units were to be enlisted into a military organization called Corpo Ausiliario delle Squadre d'Azione di Camicie Nere, and that every local Federation of the PFR (there was one in every Italian province) had to raise a military unit drafting personnel from its members. Units so formed were to be called "Black Brigades", and were to be commanded by the local Federal Secretary of the PFR, with the rank of Major or Colonel.

Their duties were:
 to provide security for the members and assets of the PFR;
 to cooperate with German and Italian law enforcement authorities;
 to help military authorities in counter-insurgency operations.

This measure was to be both a response to resistance attacks against fascist members, and to turn the PFR into a fighting force to cope with shortage of manpower for internal security. Moreover, Mussolini and other fascist leaders felt that the Fascist Party was more true to its ideology if brought back to its original spirit, when it was manned mainly by soldiers and veterans and was above all a fighting organization. In this optic, they decided to mobilize it for war duties, under the concept that every fascist was to be first of all a combatant, and had to take arms for the defense of Italy and fascism.
Black Brigades membership was compulsory for all members of the PFR deemed fit for such duties. Members were officially called Squadristi (Squad-men) (like the very first fascist Black Shirts of 1920s), and were divided into three categories: Squadristi Permanenti (Full-time squad-men), Ausiliari di pronto impiego (Ready Response Auxiliaries), Ausiliari (Auxiliaries). Only full-time personnel were required to be on duty daily, while other two categories were to be mobilized only in case of emergency.
Black Brigade members were entitled to police powers, to carry firearms and to circulate freely even during curfew. Full-time personnel received a monthly wage of ITL 200.00.

Operational service
Police effectiveness of Black Brigades was feeble at best. Aside from particularly strong and well equipped Brigades (such as VIIIth "Aldo Resega" of Milan, 2000 strong) that were exceptions, the average Black Brigades were at most 2-300 men strong, poorly equipped and armed, with little if any military training, and were hardly in conditions to defend themselves from partisan attacks, not to mention provide support to military authorities.

Many of their members were obscure figures evicted from police or army, and conspicuous were also the hardline fascists who were pushed by resentment and revenge towards that part of Italian population who, in their eyes, betrayed the Fascist regime. Many were also old "Squadristi" fascists who had served in the '20s, and who were eager to retake a first-place role in the ranks of the Fascist Party. In general terms, poor average discipline made all these individuals difficult to control, and prone to abuses.
As the military situation worsened, German mistrust towards the RSI military grew, and even Social Republic authorities looked at the Black Brigades with contempt. All these factors contributed to push the Black Brigades into political radicalization and an increasingly hostile behaviour towards the population itself, among which they gained a fearsome reputation of fanatical brutality and summary procedures.
Apart from a few Black Brigades who had been found reliable enough to be committed in regular combat against partisans and Allies, most of these formations had poor military or even police capabilities and were mainly employed in static guard duties, patrols, and were often unleashed in brutal reprisals and retaliations against partisan attacks and ambushes to RSI military personnel. 

The Brigade members not only fought the Allies and the Italian partisans, but they also fought against political opponents and other Black Brigade members whose support of "the cause" was deemed less than exuberant. Many Black Brigade members were killed in this type of in-fighting.

After the armistice (April 25, 1945) and the end of the war in Italy, many members of the Black Brigades suffered harsh reprisals from partisan forces.

War crimes
The Black Brigades were frequently involved in support of German units during anti-partisan operations which resulted in massacres of the Italian civilian population, like at the Sant'Anna di Stazzema massacre in Tuscany where the 36th Brigata helped the SS kill the entire village population of around 560 persons in August 1944. Or the Vinca massacre where 162 civilians were executed and where the 40. Brigata nera “Vittorio Ricciarelli” di Livorno was involved.

Uniforms
Members of Black Brigades were issued standard Italian army uniforms, and they tended to wear them with a black turtleneck sweater, or (in summer) the famous black shirt, as the symbol of loyalty to Mussolini and membership of the Republican Fascist Party. They sometimes wore this uniform with a windproof jacket in solid or camouflage colors. Members of Black Brigades tended to wear the grey-green uniform pants, but a wide array of uniforms were issued and, especially in closing stages of the war, Black Brigades members used just anything they could obtain: army camouflaged one-piece suits, smocks and pants, paratroopers' collarless jump jackets (very popular), tropical Italian army uniforms, German pants and feldjacken, and frequently local produced uniforms and gear.

The badge or insignia of the Black Brigades was the jawless death's head, with a dagger in its teeth, or one of assorted Italian versions. Collar tabs were issued, unique to the Black Brigades, consisting in square-shaped tabs with pointed tip, of solid black cloth, on which was pinned a bright red republican fascio, in the lower part. In the upper part, every Brigade chose its own insignia: either one of the many variants of skulls (with or without crossbones) or coloured facing. Regulations prescribed for all members of the Black Brigades to wear a metal enamelled breast badge, of roundel shape, showing a golden fascio amidst Italian national colours in vertical stripes, and surrounded by a black enamel rim with the inscription: "Corpo Ausiliario delle Squadre d'Azione di Camicie Nere", in capital letters, and in the lower part the identification number of the Brigade. Contemporary pictures show that this badge however, although certainly issued on large scale, was not so often worn.

Many Black Brigades adopted sleeve badges, following Italian military tradition, both cloth and metal. These were usually of very fine workmanship, often minted and enamelled, and are today high-priced collectors items. Rank insignias were the same of those prescribed for the Italian army; however, were rarely worn. Towards the end of the war a specific rank system was introduced for the Black Brigades, unique to them, but it does not seem to have ever been implemented.

The majority of Black Brigade members wore Italian army ski caps or berets dyed black. Some photos show members also wearing black German-style caps. Some were Italian made, some were supplied by Germany. Combat headgear was the ubiquitous M33 olive-green helmet, sometimes adorned with Black Brigades' skull insignia. German M35 helmets were also used as were M33 black MVSN helmets. Helmets were often sprayed with various camouflage pattern as was very common in that period. Combat gear and carrying equipment was the same of army soldiers. Samurai magazine vest, originally intended for elite army units, was widely used and so were a vast sorting of pouches, magazine-holders, holsters, both official issue (Italian or German) and privately made, carried on Italian M1908 olive-green leather carrying equipment.

Ranks

The Black Brigades wore a simple fourragère denoting rank.

Weapons
Carcano Rifles and Carbines
MAB38
FNAB-43
TZ-45
Beretta M34
Beretta M35
Glisenti Model 1910
Bodeo M89
Breda M30
Breda M35

Organization
The Black Brigades were not actually brigade-sized units. The Italian word brigata has a looser meaning as a synonym of "group" or "assembly". Most Black Brigades were typically weak battalions or strong companies, each comprising 200 to 300 men; the size of a brigade however varied greatly depending on the city where it was based and where it recruited its men, with Black Brigades of major cities comprising thousands of men (the 8th Black Brigade "Aldo Resega" of Milan, for instance, had over 4,000 troops, and the 1st Black Brigade "Ather Capelli" of Turin had over 2,000). There were 41 territorial brigades. The territorial brigades were numbered 1 through 41. There were also seven "independent" and eight "mobile" brigades. The mobile brigades were numbered 1 through 7, plus the Second Arditi Brigade.

Piedmont Regional Inspectorate
I	Brigata Nera "Ather Capelli" Turin
II 	Brigata Nera "Attilio Prato"     Alessandria
III 	Brigata Nera "Emilio Picot" 	 Aosta
IV 	Brigata Nera "Luigi VIale" 	 Asti
V 	Brigata Nera "Carlo Lidonnici"   Cuneo
VI 	Brigata Nera "Augusto Cristina"  Novara
VII 	Brigata Nera "Bruno Ponzecchi" 	 Vercelli
Lombardy Regional Inspectorate
VIII 	Brigata Nera "Aldo Resega" 	  Milan
IX 	Brigata Nera "Giuseppe Cortesi"   Bergamo
X 	Brigata Nera "Enrico Tognu" 	  Brescia
XI 	Brigata Nera "Cesare Rodini" 	  Como
XII 	Brigata Nera "Augusto Felisari"   Cremona
XIII 	Brigata Nera "Marcello Turchetti" Mantua
XIV 	Brigata Nera "Alberto Alfieri"    Pavia
XV 	Brigata Nera "Sergio Gatti" 	  Sondrio
XVI 	Brigata Nera "Dante Gervasini" 	  Varese
Veneto regional Inspectorate
XVII 	Brigata Nera "Bartolomeo Asara"     Venice
XVIII Brigata Nera "Luigi Begon" 	    Padua
XIX 	Brigata Nera "Romolo Gori" 	    Rovigo
XX 	Brigata Nera "Francesco Cappellini" Treviso
XXI 	Brigata Nera "Stefano Rizzardi"     Verona
XXII 	Brigata Nera "Antonio Faggion" 	    Vicenza
Emilia Regional Inspectorate
XXIII  Brigata Nera "Eugenio Facchini"   Bologna
XXIV 	 Brigata Nera "Igino Ghisellini"   Ferrara
XXV 	 Brigata Nera "Arturo Capanni" 	   Forlì
XXVI 	 Brigata Nera "Mirko Pistoni" 	   Modena
XXVII  Brigata Nera "Virginio Gavazzoli" Parma
XXVIII Brigata Nera "Pippo Astorri" 	   Piacenza
XXIX 	 Brigata Nera "Ettore Muti"    Ravenna
XXX 	 Brigata Nera "Umberto Rosi" 	   Reggio Emilia
Liguria Regional Inspectorate
XXXI 	 Brigata Nera "Generale Silvio Parodi" 	Genoa
XXXII  Brigata Nera "Antonio Padoan" 	        Imperia
XXXIII Brigata Nera "Tullio Bertoni" 	        La Spezia
XXXIV  Brigata Nera "Giovanni Briatore"       Savona
Tuscany Black Brigades
XXXV 	  Brigata Nera "Don Emilio Spinelli" 	Arezzo
XXXVI   Brigata Nera "Benito Mussolini" 	Lucca
XXXVII  Brigata Nera "Emilio Tanzi" 	        Pisa
XXXVIII Brigata Nera "Ruy Blas Biagi" 	Pistoia
IXL 	  Brigata Nera 	                        Siena
XL 	  Brigata Nera "Vittorio Ricciarelli" 	Apuania
XLI 	  Brigata Nera "Raffaele Manganiello" 	Florence
Mobile Black Brigades Grouping
I 	Brigata Nera Mobile "Vittorio Ricciarelli"  Milan
II 	Brigata Nera Mobile "Danilo Mercuri" 	    Padua
III 	Brigata Nera Mobile "Attilio Pappalardo"    Bologna
IV 	Brigata Nera Mobile "Aldo Resega" 	    Dronero-Cuneo
V 	Brigata Nera Mobile "Enrico Quagliata" 	    Val Camonica
VI 	Brigata Nera Mobile "Dalmazia" 	            Milan
VII 	Brigata Nera Mobile "Tevere" 	            Milan
II 	Brigata Nera Mobile Arditi 	            Milan
Autonomous Black Brigades
Brigata Nera Autonoma "Giovanni Gentile"
Brigata Nera Autonoma Operativa "Giuseppe Garibaldi"
Brigata Nera Autonoma Ministeriale
Brigata Nera Autonoma - Marche
Brigata Nera Autonoma - Gorizia
Brigata Nera Autonoma - Udine
Brigata Nera Autonoma "Tullio Cividino" - Trieste
Outremer Autonomous Black Brigades
Compagnia Complementare Fascisti - Rhodes

See also
29th Waffen Grenadier Division of the SS (1st Italian)

Other Axis nations:
 Volkssturm (Germany)
 Volunteer Fighting Corps (Japan)

Citations

General sources 
 Le Forze Armate della RSI - Pier Paolo Battistelli, Andrea Molinari, p. 123
 Le Forze Armate della RSI - Pier Paolo Battistelli, Andrea Molinari, p. 125
 Brianzapopolare.it 
 Mario Pellegrinetti. Giugno 1944 - I sabotaggi. La guerra civile in Garfagnana. URL consultato il 9-1-2008.
 Giampaolo Pansa, Il gladio e l'alloro - l'esercito di Salò, 1943-45 - Le Scie/A. Mondadori editore 1991
 Giorgio Pisanò, Gli ultimi in grigioverde - Voll. I-II-III - FPE edizioni, Milano 1967
 Guido Rosignoli, RSI - uniformi, equipaggiamento e armi - E. Albertelli edizioni, Parma 1985
 I. Montanelli - R. Gervaso, Storia d'Italia 1943-46, ed. Mondadori, Milano 1967

Brigades of Italy in World War II
Defunct law enforcement agencies of Italy
Fascist organizations
Italian Fascism
Italian Social Republic
Military units and formations disestablished in 1945
Military units and formations established in 1943
Military wings of fascist parties
Terrorism in Italy